Karolów may refer to the following places:
Karolów, Łódź Voivodeship (central Poland)
Karolów, Gmina Chotcza in Masovian Voivodeship (east-central Poland)
Karolów, Świętokrzyskie Voivodeship (south-central Poland)
Karolów, Gmina Sienno in Masovian Voivodeship (east-central Poland)

See also

Karlow (name)
Karolos